Hiraide, Hirade is a Japanese surname. Notable people with the surname include:

, Japanese ski mountaineer and mountain climber
, Japanese footballer
, Japanese writer, poet and lawyer
, Japanese poet and critic

Japanese-language surnames